Jowmian (also Romanized as Jowmīān and Jūmiān) is a village in Khusf Rural District, Central District, Khusf County, South Khorasan Province, Iran. At the 2006 census, its population was 357, in 103 families.

References 

Populated places in Khusf County